William Harmon (born 23 December 1994) is a New Zealand rugby union player who currently plays as a flanker for  in New Zealand's domestic Mitre 10 Cup and the  in Super Rugby.

Early career
Harmon played for New Brighton before High School. 
Harmon attended St Bede's College in Christchurch and during that time, he was selected as a member of the New Zealand Schools Barbarians squad for their matches against Australia and Samoa in 2012.

After leaving school, Harmon played for New Brighton again in club rugby while working full-time as a plumber.   He was in excellent form during the 2016 club rugby season, captaining New Brighton to the final of the Hawkins Division 1 Trophy.   Unfortunately, the season didn't end well for him as he was red carded as his side went down to Lincoln University.

His impressive club form didn't go unnoticed and through 2015 and 2016 he spent time with the  Academy and turned out for Canterbury's Colts and Maori sides.

Senior career

Harmon was named in 's squad for the 2016 Mitre 10 Cup.

At the end of 2020, Harmon signed a two year deal to play for the Highlanders in Super Rugby.

References

External links

1994 births
Living people
New Zealand rugby union players
Rugby union flankers
Canterbury rugby union players
People educated at St Bede's College, Christchurch
Crusaders (rugby union) players
Highlanders (rugby union) players
Māori All Blacks players
Rugby union players from Christchurch